Álvaro Torres (born April 9, 1954) is a Salvadoran singer-songwriter.

Biography 
Álvaro Torres was born on April 9, 1954, in Usulután, El Salvador. Torres moved to Guatemala and started a solo career recording his first album, "Algo especial" (Something Special) in 1976. In 1977 he released the album "Acariciame" (Caress Me) and one year later, he was selected by TCS to represent his country in the seventh edition of the OTI Festival that was held in Santiago, Chile. Although he got the second to last place, tied with the Colombian entrant Billy Pontoni, this was not an obstacle for his career. He became better known in the 1980s. Years later, Torres moved to the United States. He lived in Colorado, California and finally Florida. In 1991 Torres had an artistic breakthrough when he released "Nada Se Compara Contigo". He was voted Songwriter of the Year by BMI in 1994.

Some of his more famous songs are "Hazme olvidarla", "La Unica" (The Only One), "Lo Que Se Dice Olvidar", "Si Estuvieras Conmigo" (If you were here with me) and "Nada se compara contigo" (Nothing Compares to You), "A ti mi amor" (To you my love), "Te Olvidaré" (I'll Forget You), "El último romántico" (The Last Romantic). He sang a duet with the Mexican singer Marisela on the song "Mi amor por ti" (My Love for You), and also sang a duet with Selena on the song "Buenos amigos" (Good Friends), and in 1997 he recorded "Estaremos Juntos" (We Will Be together) a duet with Puerto Rican singer Millie Corretjer for her album Sola (Alone).

Some of his musical influences are Sandro, Camilo Sesto, and Joan Manuel Serrat.

Discography

1986: Tres (#47)
1988: Adicto (#40)
1988: Amor Que Mata (#19)
1988: Hazme Olvidarla (#7)
1989: Por lo Mucho Que Te Amo (#29)
1990: Ni Tú Ni Ella (#3)
1990: Si Estuvieras Conmigo (#9)
1991: Mi Verdadero Amor (#13)
1992: Nada Se Compara Contigo (#1)
1992: He Vivido Esperando Por Ti (#4)
1992: Cruz de Olvido (#31)
1993: Te Olvidaré (#11)
1993: Me Arrepiento de Quererte (#28)
1993: Te Dejo Libre (#4)
1993: Estoy Enamorado de Tí (#19)
1993: Que Lastimá (Nueva version) (#7)
1994: Angel Caido (#7)
1994: Tu Mejor Amigo (#11)
1994: Contigo Sí (#17)
1995: Reencuentro (con Barrio Boyzz) (#11)
1998: El Ultimo Romántico (#12)

The Beginning 
The first song he wrote was titled “Dulce amiga” at the age of 12, inspired by a childhood friend who allowed to watch television at her house. From then on, the woman became his main source of inspiration.

In that same year Pepe Rodas, director of the Radio Corporación, whom Álvaro met in one of the restaurants where he sang, invited him to the studios to record the demo that would change the course of his life. While in the studios, Rodas gave him an instrumental record by the Franck Pourcel Orchestra and a letter that he himself had composed for that melody.

References

External links
 Sitio Oficial – alvarotorres (Official website)

1954 births
Living people
People from Usulután Department
Latin pop singers
20th-century Salvadoran male singers
EMI Latin artists
Latin music songwriters